The Second Battle of Anandpur (1704) (anadapura dī dūjī laṛā'ī sāla satārāṁ sau cāra), also known as the Siege of Anandpur (anadapura dī ghērābadī), was fought at Anandpur, between Sikhs and the Mughal generals Wazir Khan and Zaberdast Khan aided by the vassal Rajas of the Sivalik Hills in May 1704.

Background
The hill Rajas were concerned about Gobind Singh's rising power and influence in their region along with dislike for the Sikh movement. In addition, the hill Rajas were frustrated by the raids on their villages by the Sikhs from Anandpur who sought to acquire supplies, provisions and cash. Earlier in 1704, the Mughal troops were repulsed in northern Punjab at Basoli and Anandpur. Consequently, the Rajas of several hill states (including Jammu, Nurpur, Mandi, Kullu, Guler, Chamba, Srinagar, Dadhwal, and Hindur) assembled at Bilaspur to discuss the situation. The son of Bhim Chand, Raja Ajmer Chand of Kahlur, suggested forming an alliance to curb the Gobind Singh's rising power. Accordingly, the Rajas formed an alliance with the Mughals, and marched towards Anandpur.

They sent a letter to Gobind Singh, asking him to pay the arrears of rent for Anandpur (which lied in Ajmer Chand's territory), and leave the city to which Gobind Singh insisted that the land was bought by his father, and is therefore, his own property.

Siege
In May 1704, Generals Wazir Khan and Zaberdast Khan, sent by the Mughal Emperor Aurangzeb, joined by the Hill Rajas, besieged Anandpur in an attempt to remove Guru and his followers. The army of the Guru kept the Mughals and hillmen at bay but being surrounded by heavy odds, took refuge in Anandpur fort, where they were besieged for many months, with all supplies and communications cut off. Emperor Aurangzeb sent a written assurance by promising on the Quran, whereas Hill Rajas swore by their gods, with the safety of all Sikhs if the Guru decided to evacuate the fort, and after a long drawn out siege, Gobind Singh and his followers, facing starvation, capitulated in return for safe passage, but the Sikhs were treacherously attacked at the Sarsa, with all assurances and solemn oaths betrayed by the Mughals and Hill Rajas.

Notes

References

Sources
 
 

Anandpur, Second Battle of